This is a list of lighthouses in the French Southern and Antarctic Lands.

Lighthouses

See also
 Lists of lighthouses and lightvessels

References

External links
 

French Southern and Antarctic Lands